The Elder Futhark (or Fuþark), also known as the Older Futhark, Old Futhark, or Germanic Futhark, is the oldest form of the runic alphabets. It was a writing system used by Germanic peoples for Northwest Germanic dialects in the Migration Period. Inscriptions are found on artifacts including jewelry, amulets, plateware, tools, and weapons, as well as runestones in Scandinavia, from the 2nd to the 10th centuries. 

In Scandinavia, beginning in the late 8th century, the script was simplified to the Younger Futhark, while the Anglo-Saxons and Frisians instead extended it, giving rise to the Anglo-Saxon futhorc. Both the Anglo-Saxon futhorc and the Younger Futhark remained in use during the Early and the High Middle Ages respectively, but knowledge of how to read the Elder Futhark was forgotten until 1865, when it was deciphered by Norwegian scholar Sophus Bugge.

Description
The Elder Futhark (named after the initial phoneme of the first six rune names: F, U, Þ, A, R and K) has 24 runes, often arranged in three groups of eight runes; each group is called an ætt (pl. ættir). In the following table, each rune is given with its common transliteration:

The remaining transliterations correspond to the IPA symbol of their approximate value.

The earliest known sequential listing of the alphabet dates to 400 AD and is found on the Kylver Stone in Gotland, [ᚠ] and [ᚹ] only partially inscribed but widely authenticated:

However, in January 2023, an even older stone with runic inscriptions was found in Tyrifjorden. It dates from between 1~250 AD and appears to include the name dedication ᛁᛞᛁᛒᛖᚱᚢᚷ idiberug, perhaps meaning "for Idibera".

Two instances of another early inscription were found on the two Vadstena and Mariedamm bracteates (6th century), showing the division in three ætts, with the positions of ï, p and o, d inverted compared to the Kylver stone:
f u þ a r k g w; h n i j ï p z s; t b e m l ŋ o d
The Grumpan bracteate presents a listing from 500 which is identical to the one found on the previous bracteates but incomplete:
f u þ a r k g w ... h n i j ï p (z) ... t b e m l (ŋ) (o) d

Origins

Derivation from Italic alphabets

The Elder Futhark runes are commonly believed to originate in the Old Italic scripts: either a North Italic variant (Etruscan or Raetic alphabets), or the Latin alphabet itself. Derivation from the Greek alphabet via Gothic contact to Byzantine Greek culture was a popular theory in the 19th century, but has been ruled out since the dating of the Vimose inscriptions to the 2nd century (whereas the Goths were in contact with Greek culture only from the early 3rd century).

The angular shapes of the runes, presumably an adaptation to the incision in wood or metal, are not a Germanic innovation, but a property that is shared with other early alphabets, including the Old Italic ones (compare, for example, the Duenos inscription). The 4th century BC Negau helmet inscription features a Germanic name, Harigastiz, in a North Etruscan alphabet, and may be a testimony of the earliest contact of Germanic speakers with alphabetic writing. Similarly, the Meldorf inscription of 50 may qualify as "proto-runic" use of the Latin alphabet by Germanic speakers. The Raetic "alphabet of Bolzano" in particular seems to fit the letter shapes well. The spearhead of Kovel, dated to 200 AD, sometimes advanced as evidence of a peculiar Gothic variant of the runic alphabet, bears an inscription tilarids that may in fact be in an Old Italic rather than a runic alphabet, running right to left with a T and a D closer to the Latin or Etruscan than to the Bolzano or runic alphabets. Perhaps an "eclectic" approach can yield the best results for the explanation of the origin of the runes: most shapes of the letters can be accounted for when deriving them from several distinct North Italic writing systems: The p rune has a parallel in the Camunic alphabet, while it has been argued that d derives from the shape of the letter san (= ś) in Lepontic where it seems to represent the sound /d/.

The g, a, f, i, t, m and l runes show no variation, and are generally accepted as identical to the Old Italic or Latin letters X, A, F, I, T, M and L, respectively. There is also wide agreement that the u, r, k, h, s, b and o runes respectively correspond directly to V, R, C, H, S, B and O.

The runes of uncertain derivation may either be original innovations, or adaptions of otherwise unneeded Latin letters.  suggests that all 22 Latin letters of the classical Latin alphabet (1st Century, ignoring marginalized K) were adapted (ᚦ from D, ᛉ from Y, ᛜ from Q, Ƿ from P, ᛃ from G, ᛇ from Z), with two runes (ᛈ and ᛞ) left over as original Germanic innovations. There are conflicting scholarly opinions regarding the ᛖ (from E ?), ᚾ (from N ?), ᚦ (D ? or Raetic Θ ?), Ƿ (Q or P ?), ᛇ and ᛉ (both from either Z or Latin Y ?), ᛜ (Q ?), and ᛞ runes.

Of the 24 runes in the classical futhark row attested from 400 (Kylver stone), ï, p and ŋ are unattested in the earliest inscriptions of c. 175 to 400, while e in this early period mostly takes a Π-shape, its M-shape gaining prevalence only from the 5th century. Similarly, the s rune may have either three or four strokes (and more rarely five or more), and only from the 5th century does the variant with three strokes become prevalent.

The "mature" runes of the 6th to 8th centuries tend to have only three directions of strokes, the vertical and two diagonal directions. Early inscriptions also show horizontal strokes: these appear in the case of e (mentioned above), but also in t, l, ŋ and h.

Date and purpose of invention
The general agreement dates the creation of the first runic alphabet to roughly the 1st century. Early estimates include the 1st century BC, and late estimates push the date into the 2nd century. The question is one of estimating the "findless" period separating the script's creation from the Vimose finds of c. 160. If either ï or z indeed derive from Latin Y or Z, as suggested by Odenstedt, the first century BC is ruled out, because these letters were only introduced into the Latin alphabet during the reign of Augustus.

Other scholars are content to assume a findless period of a few decades, pushing the date into the early 2nd century. Pedersen (and with him Odenstedt) suggests a period of development of about a century to account for their assumed derivation of the shapes of þ  and j  from Latin D and G.

The invention of the script has been ascribed to a single person or a group of people who had come into contact with Roman culture, maybe as mercenaries in the Roman army, or as merchants.

Rune names
Each rune most probably had a name, chosen to represent the sound of the rune itself according to the principle of acrophony.

The Old English names of all 24 runes of the Elder Futhark, along with five names of runes unique to the Anglo-Saxon runes, are preserved in the Old English rune poem, compiled in the 7th century. These names are in good agreement with medieval Scandinavian records of the names of the 16 Younger Futhark runes, and to some extent also with those of the letters of the Gothic alphabet (recorded by Alcuin in the 9th century). Therefore, it is assumed that the names go back to the Elder Futhark period, at least to the 5th century. There is no positive evidence that the full row of 24 runes had been completed before the end of the 4th century, but it is likely that at least some runes had their name before that time.

This concerns primarily the runes used magically, especially the Teiwaz and Ansuz runes which are taken to symbolize or invoke deities in sequences such as that on the Lindholm amulet (3rd or 4th century).

Reconstructed names in Common Germanic can easily be given for most runes. Exceptions are the þ rune (which is given different names in Anglo-Saxon, Gothic and Scandinavian traditions) and the z rune (whose original name is unknown, and preserved only in corrupted form from Old English tradition). The 24 Elder Futhark runes are:

Each rune derived its sound from the first phoneme of the rune's respective name, with the exception of Ingwaz and Algiz: the Proto-Germanic z sound of the Algiz rune never occurred in a word-initial position. The phoneme acquired an r-like quality in Proto-Norse, usually transliterated with ʀ, and finally merged with r in Icelandic, rendering the rune superfluous as a letter. Similarly, the ng-sound of the Ingwaz rune does not occur word-initially.
The names come from the vocabulary of daily life and mythology, some trivial, some beneficent and some inauspicious:
 Mythology: Tiwaz, Thurisaz, Ingwaz, God, Man, Sun.
 Nature and environment: Sun, day, year, hail, ice, lake, water, birch, yew, pear, elk, aurochs.
 Daily life and human condition: Man, need/constraint, wealth/cattle, horse, estate/inheritance, slag/protection from evil, ride/journey, year/harvest, gift, joy, need, ulcer/illness.

IPA vowels and consonants

Inscription corpus

Old Futhark inscriptions were found on artifacts scattered between the Carpathians and Lappland, with the highest concentration in Denmark. They are usually short inscriptions on jewelry (bracteates, fibulae, belt buckles), utensils (combs, spinning whorls) or weapons (lance tips, seaxes) and were mostly found in graves or bogs.

Scandinavian inscriptions
Words frequently appearing in inscriptions on bracteates with possibly magical significance are alu, laþu and laukaz. While their meaning is unclear, alu has been associated with "ale, intoxicating drink", in a context of ritual drinking, and laukaz with "leek, garlic", in a context of fertility and growth. An example of a longer early inscription is on a 4th-century axe-handle found in Nydam, Jutland: wagagastiz / alu:??hgusikijaz:aiþalataz (wagagastiz "wave-guest" could be a personal name, the rest has been read as alu:wihgu sikijaz:aiþalataz with a putative meaning "wave/flame-guest, from a bog, alu, I, oath-sayer consecrate/fight". The obscurity even of emended readings is typical for runic inscriptions that go beyond simple personal names). A term frequently found in early inscriptions is Erilaz, apparently describing a person with knowledge of runes.

The oldest known runic inscription dates to the Roman Iron Age, c. 1 - 250 CE, and is found on the Svingerud Runestone found in Ringerike, Norway, in Autumn 2021. It has several sections, notably a name idiberug (possibly idiberun), which could be interpreted as one of several names, including Idibera, Idibergu, or the family name Idiberung. The first three letters of the Elder Futhark, ᚠ (f), ᚢ (u) and ᚦ (th), are also found on the stone.

The runic inscription previously thought to be the oldest dates to 160 and is found on the Vimose Comb discovered in the bog of Vimose, Funen. The inscription reads harja, either a personal name or an epithet, viz. Proto-Germanic *harjaz (PIE ) "warrior", or simply the word for "comb" (*hārijaz). Another early inscription is found on the Thorsberg chape (200), probably containing the theonym Ullr.

The typically Scandinavian runestones begin to show the transition to Younger Futhark from the 6th century, with transitional examples like the Björketorp or Stentoften stones. In the early 9th century, both the older and the younger futhark were known and used, which is shown on the Rök runestone where the runemaster used both.

The longest known inscription in the Elder Futhark, and one of the youngest, consists of some 200 characters and is found on the early 8th century Eggjum stone, and may even contain a stanza of Old Norse poetry.

The Caistor-by-Norwich astragalus reading raïhan "deer" is notable as the oldest inscription of the British Isles, dating to 400, the very end of Roman Britain.

Continental inscriptions
The oldest inscriptions (before 500) found on the Continent are divided into two groups, the area of the North Sea coast and Northern Germany (including parts of the Netherlands) associated with the Saxons and Frisians on one hand (part of the "North Germanic Koine"), and loosely scattered finds from along the Oder to south-eastern Poland, as far as the Carpathian Mountains (e.g. the ring of Pietroassa in Romania), associated with East Germanic peoples. The latter group disappears during the 5th century, the time of contact of the Goths with the Roman Empire and their conversion to Christianity.

In this early period, there is no specifically West Germanic runic tradition. This changes from the early 6th century, and for about one century (520 to 620), an Alamannic "runic province" emerges, with examples on fibulae, weapon parts and belt buckles. As in the East Germanic case, use of runes subsides with Christianization, in the case of the Alamanni in the course of the 7th century.

Distribution
There are some 350 known Elder Futhark inscriptions with 81 known inscriptions from the South (Germany, Austria, Switzerland) and 267 from Scandinavia. The precise numbers are debatable because of some suspected forgeries, and some disputed inscriptions (identification as "runes" vs. accidental scratches, simple ornaments or Latin letters). 133 Scandinavian inscriptions are on bracteates (compared to 2 from the South), and 65 are on runestones (no Southern example is extant). Southern inscriptions are predominantly on fibulae (43, compared to 15 in Scandinavia). The Scandinavian runestones belong to the later period of the Elder Futhark, and initiate the boom of medieval Younger Futhark stones (with some 6,000 surviving examples). As of 2021, one inscription was found in a settlement associated with Slavs.

Elder Futhark inscriptions were rare, with very few active literati, in relation to the total population, at any time, so that knowledge of the runes was probably an actual "secret" throughout the Migration period. Of 366 lances excavated at Illerup, only 2 bore inscriptions. A similar ratio is estimated for Alemannia, with an estimated 170 excavated graves to every inscription found.

Estimates of the total number of inscriptions produced are based on the "minimal runological estimate" of 40,000 (ten individuals making ten inscriptions per year for four centuries). The actual number was probably considerably higher. The 80 known Southern inscriptions are from some 100,000 known graves. With an estimated total of 50,000,000 graves (based on population density estimates), some 80,000 inscriptions would have been produced in total in the Merovingian South alone (and maybe close to 400,000 in total, so that of the order of 0.1% of the corpus has come down to us), and  estimates a population of several hundred active literati throughout the period, with as many as 1,600 during the Alamannic "runic boom" of the 6th century.

List of inscriptions

After , .
 Scandinavia
 Period I (150–550)
 Svingerud Runestone (1-250)
 Vimose inscriptions (6 objects, 160–300)
 Øvre Stabu spearhead (c. 180), raunijaz
 Illerup inscriptions (9 objects)
 Mos spearhead (c. 300), gaois(?)
 Golden horns of Gallehus (c. 400)
 Einang stone (400)
 Kylver Stone (400)
 Rö Runestone (400–450)
 Kalleby Runestone (5th century)
 Möjbro Runestone (400–550)
 Järsberg Runestone (500–550)
 Hogganvik runestone (5th century)
 Bracteates: total 133 (see also Alu)
 Seeland-II-C (500)
 Vadstena bracteate
 Tjurkö bracteate
 Period II (550–700)
 Skåäng Runestone (6th century?)
 Björketorp Runestone
 Gummarp Runestone
 Istaby Runestone
 Stentoften Runestone
 South-Eastern Europe (200–550): 4 AD.
 Gothic runic inscriptions (200–350)
 Continental inscriptions (mainly Germany; 200–700): 50 legible, 15 illegible (39 brooches, 11 weapon parts, 4 fittings and belt buckles, 3 strap ends, 8 other)
 Thorsberg chape (200)
 Bülach fibula
 Charnay fibula
 Nordendorf fibula
 Pforzen buckle
 English and Frisian (300–700): 44; see futhorc

Unicode

The Elder Futhark is encoded in Unicode within the unified Runic range, 16A0–16FF. Among the freely available TrueType fonts that include this range are Junicode and FreeMono.	
The Kylver Stone row encoded in Unicode reads:

Encoded separately is the "continental" double-barred h-rune, . A graphical variant of the ng-rune, is also encoded separately. These two have separate codepoints because they become independent letters in the Anglo-Saxon futhorc. The numerous other graphical variants of Elder Futhark runes are considered glyph variants and not given Unicode codepoints. Similarly, bind runes are considered ligatures and not given Unicode codepoints.

See also
 Rune poem
 Runic script
 Younger Futhark

Notes

References

Bibliography
 .
 
 
 .
 .
 
 
 
 .
 .
 .
 .
 
 .
 .

External links

 Runenprojekt inscription database at the University of Kiel
 
 Ancient Scripts: Futhark
 Omniglot.com – Elder Futhark
 Rune Converter hosted by Viking Rune
 Futhark Hávamál Select stanzas of the Hávamál rendered in Elder Futhark and English

 
Migration Period